Sunbury is a city and county seat of Northumberland County, Pennsylvania, United States. The principal city in the Sunbury, PA Micropolitan Statistical Area, it is also one of three principal cities in the Bloomsburg-Berwick-Sunbury, PA Combined Statistical Area.

Located in Central Pennsylvania's Susquehanna Valley on the east bank of the Susquehanna River, just downstream of the confluence of its main and west branches, Sunbury dates to the early 18th century. Its population was 9,905 at the 2010 census.

Rich in history, its Hotel Edison became the first building in the city to be lit with Thomas Edison's three-wire system in 1883, and was later named in his honor. John W. Treadwell, Jr., a nine-year-old boy in the crowd of onlookers, was given the privilege of throwing the switch that turned on those new lights. 

Other historic sites include the Beck House, Northumberland County Courthouse, and Sunbury Historic District, all of which are listed on the National Register of Historic Places.

History
 The first human settlement of Sunbury was probably Shawnee migrants. A large population of Delaware Indians was also forcibly resettled there in the early 18th century after they lost rights to their land in the Walking Purchase. Canasatego of the Six Nations, enforcing the Walking Purchase of behalf of George Thomas, Deputy Governor of Pennsylvania, ordered the Delaware Indians to go to two places on the Susquehanna River, one of which was present-day Sunbury.

From 1727 to 1756, Sunbury was one of the largest and most influential Indian settlements in Pennsylvania. At that time, it was known as Shamokin, not to be confused with the present-day city of Shamokin, Pennsylvania, which is located to the east.

In 1745, Presbyterian missionary David Brainerd described the city as being located on both the east and west sides of the river, and on an island. Brainerd reported that the city housed 300 Indians, half of which were Delawares and the other Seneca and Tutelo.

 In 1754, much of the land west of the Susquehanna was transferred from the Six Nations to Pennsylvania at the Albany Congress. However, Shamokin was not sold and was reserved by the Six Nations, "to settle such of our Nations as shall come to us from the Ohio or any others who shall deserve to be in our Alliance." According to Weslager, "the Pennsylvania authorities had no opposition to the Six Nations reserving Wyoming and Shamokin from the sale, since friendly Delawares, including Teedyuskung (also known as Teedyuscung) and his people living in those settlements--and any other Indians who might be placed there--constituted a buffer against Connecticut."

The French and Indian War brought fighting to much of the region. The Delaware Indian residents of Shamokin remained neutral for much of the early part of the war, in part because a drought and unseasonable frost in Shamokin in 1755 left them without provisions. 

However, the Delaware Indians at Shamokin joined the war against Pennsylvania and the English after the Gnadenhutten massacre in 1755. Pennsylvania Fort Augusta was built in 1756 at Shamokin. Read more about early history of Sunbury in Shamokin (village). Bloody Springs is a historic site from the era.

On March 21, 1772, Northumberland County was incorporated and subdivided. The settlement of Shamokin was renamed Sunbury that same year, and the present-day city of Sunbury identifies 1772 as the date of its establishment. It was named after Sunbury-on-Thames, a town in the Surrey borough of Spelthorne, England, just outside Greater London.

Lorenzo Da Ponte, the librettist of Mozart and of Salieri, lived in Sunbury for some years after his arrival in America.

In July 1883, American inventor Thomas Edison installed the first successful three-wire electric lighting system in at what was then known as the City Hotel. At the city's 150th anniversary celebration in 1922, it was renamed the Edison Hotel.

Geography
Sunbury is at  (40.863894, -76.789174). It is located at the point where the west and north branches of the Susquehanna converge.

Climate

Demographics

Sunbury is the largest principal city of the Sunbury-Lewisburg-Selinsgrove, Pennsylvania, a Combined Statistical Area that includes the Sunbury (Northumberland County), Lewisburg (Union County), and Selinsgrove (Snyder County) micropolitan areas, which had a combined population of 173,726 at the 2000 census.

As of the census of 2010, there were 9,905 people, 4,540 households, and 2,637 families residing in the city. The population density was 4,716.7 people per square mile. There were 4,864 housing units at an average density of 2,316.2 per square mile. The racial makeup of Sunbury in 2000 was 95.26% White, 1.29% African American, 0.14% Native American, 0.26% Asian, 0.02% Pacific Islander, 1.91% from other races, and 1.11% from two or more races. Hispanic or Latino of any race were 3.09% of the population.

In 2000, there were 4,540 households, of which 28.7% had children under the age of 18 living with them, 39.2% were married couples living together, 14.3% had a female householder with no husband present, and 41.9% were non-families. 36.3% of all households were made up of individuals, and 16.7% had someone living alone who was 65 years of age or older. The average household size was 2.24 and the average family size was 2.91.

In 2000, the city the population had 23.9% under the age of 18, 8.7% from 18 to 24, 29.5% from 25 to 44, 20.5% from 45 to 64, and 17.4% who were 65 years of age or older. The median age was 37 years. For every 100 females, there were 87.6 males. For every 100 females age 18 and over, there were 83.7 males.

The median income for a household in Sunbury was $25,893 in 2000, and the median income for a family was $33,148. Males had a median income of $26,497 versus $18,994 for females. The per capita income was $13,350. About 14.6% of families and 18.1% of the population were below the poverty line, including 26.7% of those under age 18 and 11.9% of those age 65 or over.

Notable businesses
Weis Markets, a regional supermarket chain operating in seven states, is headquartered in Sunbury. The company is a significant employer in the city and the region.

Great Coasters International is a roller coaster design and manufacturing firm and lists its contact address in Sunbury, though it is located outside of the city limits.

Sunbury Motor Company is a family-owned and -operated company since 1915; it is on North 4th Street.

The Squeeze-In on Market Street is an iconic business that sells hot dogs seven days a week with just five stools. The business is just 7.5 feet wide. Hot dogs are sold to-go out the service window. Serving hot dogs since 1945.  

Zimmerman Motors on Market Street is a family business that began making horse-drawn carriages in 1889 and now sells automobiles.

Education

The local public school system is the Shikellamy School District. There is a campus of Lackawanna College in the city.

Libraries
The Degenstein Community Library at 40 South Fifth Street provides print, video, microfilm, and online resources. 

The Northumberland County Historical Society maintains the Charlotte Darrah Walter Genealogical Library. It contains material on local history along with thousands of records of early families from Northumberland County and surrounding counties. Access to records is on a fee basis. The permanent exhibits deal with the site in prehistoric times, at the time of the Moravian Mission and blacksmith shop, and Fort Augusta during the French and Indian War and later under the Americans, during the Revolutionary War.

Media
The local newspaper is The Daily Item. There are a variety of local radio stations, including the all news/sports channel WKOK 1070 kHz AM, the Big Country Radio Network (WLGL 92.3 FM, WQBG 100.5 FM, and WWBE 98.3 FM) and WFYY Y106.5 FM and 94.1 WQKX.

Notable people
 Tim Boetsch is a UFC fighter with training in American mixed martial arts.
Betty Brice (1888-1935) was a silent film actress from Sunbury.
 Charles M. Clement, Pennsylvania Army National Guard Major General.
 Lorenzo da Ponte, Mozart's librettist (Cosi fan Tutte, Le Nozze di Figaro and Don Giovanni) lived in Sunbury from 1811 to 1818.
 Charles L. Dering, Wisconsin lawyer and politician, was born in Sunbury.
William Lewis Dewart (1821-1888), Congressman from Sunbury.
 The Honorable John Peter Shindel Gobin, Lieutenant Governor, Commonwealth of Pennsylvania and Commanding Officer, 47th Regiment, Pennsylvania Volunteer Infantry
 Steve Kline, former Major League pitcher
 Euell Gibbons, an outdoorsman and early health food advocate
 Brenda Lewis, Metropolitan Opera soprano and Broadway star
 Timothy Murphy, American Revolutionary War soldier/sniper (Battle of Bemis Heights)
 Glen Retief, Lambda Literary award-winning writer and author of The Jack Bank, A Memoir of a South African Childhood.
 Shikellamy, also known as Swatana, was an Oneida chief and overseer for the Iroquois confederacy who, as a supervisor for the Six Nations, oversaw the Shawnee and Lenape tribes in central Pennsylvania along the Susquehanna River. In 1742, he moved to the village of Shamokin, modern day Sunbury, and lived there until his death in 1748. He is reputed to be buried nearby.
 Peterson Toscano, playwright, actor, Bible scholar, and human rights activist.

In popular culture
In the episode titled "Nixon vs. Kennedy" in first season of the AMC cable drama Mad Men a train supposedly carrying the unrecognizable body of Pvt. Dick Whitman, who was killed in the Korean War, arrives in Sunbury.  The escort officer with the casket is said to be Lt. Don Draper, and the casket is met by Dick Whitman's adoptive mother, his half brother, Adam and his mother's second husband. In fact, the person killed in Korea was Don Draper, and Dick Whitman has switched identities with Draper.  Though Dick Whitman posing as Draper attempts to hide, Adam Whitman sees him, recognizes him, and chases the train as it leaves the station.

On September 29th 2020, Sunbury was featured on the Comedy Central television series Tosh.0 in a recurring video category called Shithole of the Week, a segment in which host Daniel Tosh takes images or videos of various communities found online and will select the "Winner" based on the comedic negative features based in that community. The image that secured Sunbury's placement was a June 2020 video of a man spray painting "WIGHTE LIVES MATTER" on his personal fence with the intent of spelling "White Lives Matter". Nearby city Shamokin was a previous "winner" of the same segment in 2016.

Parks and recreation
The extensive Sunbury Riverfront Park Project is in the planning and implementation stages in Sunbury. An extensive floodwall protection system was designed and built by the US Army Corps of Engineers in 1951. Additional height was added to the wall in 2003. The system has provided protection from 15 major flood events over the past 50 years. The wall held back the water and residents showed their gratitude in messages they wrote on the wall.

 Hurricane Agnes in late June 1972 was blamed for 10 deaths in Lancaster County, eight in Dauphin County, five in York County and four in both Northumberland and Luzerne counties, according to the Susquehanna River Basin Commission.

Additionally, a multimillion-dollar fish ladder is being built across the river in Shamokin Dam to mitigate the impediment of the shad migration up the Susquehanna River caused by the annual inflation of the Adam T. Bower Fabri Dam.

The Adam T. Bower Memorial Dam, an inflatable fabric-tube dam barrage impounding the Susquehanna River, creates the  Augusta Lake for recreation. It is inflated in May and deflated in the fall. The new waterfront development in Sunbury will provide a marina with transient boat docks, walking trails, gardens, an amphitheater and a new accessible fishing pier. Three acres of land will be added to the river side of the flood wall.

The city offers baseball fields, a skating park, tennis courts, playgrounds, a community pool and a small park that is next to the county courthouse, in the downtown area.

A vacant building in the Shikellamy State Park along the river is under consideration for redevelopment as an environmental research and education center. Designed in the 1960s, the facility was originally the Basse Beck Environmental Center. It has been empty for several years.

Economy
The city and state struggle economically, part of America's "Rust Belt". A Brookings Institution publication has cited reasons including a lack of inter-municipal coordination and cooperation, a changing employment base and a dearth of jobs paying a living wage, out-migration of young people, an aging population, the need for workforce development, and an inequitable local tax structure.

The Greater Susquehanna Valley United Way in 2006 commissioned a study regarding what matters most in area communities. They found that some major concerns were alcohol and drug use among all age groups and its effects on the community, the dependency on social services and assistance across generations, and a lack of public transportation. It is the intention of the organization to focus spending on these issues.

The Susquehanna Industrial Development Corporation (SIDCO) received $173,500 in planning grant funding (2005) to support the redevelopment of the Wilhold Manufacturing facility in Sunbury. The BOS funding paid for a market study, phase II environmental study, wetland review, traffic impact study and title survey. The site, an  former rail yard and plastic manufacturing plant, is to be developed into four,  shovel ready sites. It was suggested that the redevelopment of this facility will result in the creation of 120 jobs. The site was purchased by Moran Industries, based in Watsontown, for $200,000. Moran is using the space for food grade storage.

Weis Markets has its corporate headquarters in Sunbury.

Notes and references

External links

 Official City website
 Northumberland County Historical Society, Sunbury, Pennsylvania
 Photos of Sunbury and Shamokin
 Sunbury Guards (Company F, 11th Regiment, Pennsylvania Volunteer Infantry)
 Sunbury Guards (Company C, 47th Regiment, Pennsylvania Volunteer Infantry)

 
Cities in Pennsylvania
Pennsylvania populated places on the Susquehanna River
County seats in Pennsylvania
Populated places established in 1772
Counties
Cities in Northumberland County, Pennsylvania